Utricularia simulans, the fringed bladderwort, is a small to medium-sized, probably perennial, carnivorous plant that belongs to the genus Utricularia. U. simulans is native to tropical Africa and the Americas. U. simulans was originally described and published by Robert Knud Friedrich Pilger in 1914.

Synonyms 
U. simulans covers a vast native range and is an extremely variable species, which accounts for the moderate amount of synonymy.
[Aranella fimbriata Barnhart]
[Cosmiza longeciliata Small]
?Polypompholyx bicolor Klotzsch
P. laciniata Benj.
P. laciniata var. rubrocalcarata Griseb.
Utricularia congesta Steyerm.
U. congesta f. deminutiva Steyerm.
[U. fimbriata Leon & Alain]
U. laciniata Mart.
[U. laciniata Buscal.]
U. laciniata var. poeppigiana Buscal.
[U. longeciliata Oliv.]
U. orinocensis Steyerm.
U. surinamensis Buscal.

See also 
 List of Utricularia species

References

External links

Carnivorous plants of Africa
Carnivorous plants of Central America
Carnivorous plants of North America
Carnivorous plants of South America
Flora of Angola
Flora of Belize
Flora of Bolivia
Flora of Brazil
Flora of Cameroon
Flora of Chad
Flora of Colombia
Flora of Cuba
Flora of Florida
Flora of French Guiana
Flora of Gabon
Flora of Guinea-Bissau
Flora of Guyana
Flora of Liberia
Flora of Mali
Flora of Paraguay
Flora of Senegal
Flora of Suriname
Flora of the Democratic Republic of the Congo
Flora of Venezuela
Flora of Zambia
simulans
Flora without expected TNC conservation status